Xylocoridea is a monotypic genus of exclusively European flower bugs in the tribe Cardiastethini, erected by Odo Reuter in 1876.  The "xylo-" prefix indicates that these insects are associated with wood.

Species 
The single species Xylocoridea brevipennis Reuter, 1876 is recorded from Europe including: France, Germany, Belgium, the Netherlands, Italy and the British Isles (mostly southern England).  This species is commonly found under bark in deciduous and coniferous woodland, with recorded trees including: Pinus, Platanus and Tilia.

See also
 List of heteropteran bugs recorded in Britain

References

External links
 

Cimicomorpha genera
Hemiptera of Europe
Anthocoridae